Kim Saiki-Maloney (born January 24, 1966) is a Japanese-American professional golfer who played on the LPGA Tour from 1992 to 2007.

Saiki was born in Inglewood, California. She won the 1983 U.S. Girls' Junior. She was a college All-America at the University of Southern California in 1986 and graduated in 1988 with a degree in Public Administration. She turned professional in 1989.

Saiki played on several tours before joining the LPGA Tour: Players West Golf Tour in 1989 (winning five times), Futures Tour in 1990 (winning twice), Women Professional Golfers' European Tour in 1991, and the Ladies Asian Tour in 1991.

Siaki played over a decade on the LPGA Tour before winning the 2004 Wegmans Rochester LPGA. She competed under the name Kim Saiki-Maloney after marrying in 2006.

Professional wins

LPGA Tour wins (1)

Futures Tour
1990 FUTURES Mid Florida Competition, Pinseeker FUTURES Golf Classic

Players West Golf Tour
1989 five wins

References

External links

American female golfers
LPGA Tour golfers
Golfers from California
American sportspeople of Japanese descent
Sportspeople from Inglewood, California
1966 births
Living people
21st-century American women